The Brisbane Baylands is a  parcel of land in Brisbane, just south of the San Francisco border. There have been several proposals to develop the site, which was previously used as a railyard and a municipal landfill; historical uses have led to contaminated soil, polluted stormwater runoff, and potential buried toxic waste. None of the present proposals have been approved by Brisbane's city council.

The approximately triangular site is oriented primarily north–south and is bounded by Bayshore Boulevard to the west, the Bayshore Freeway to the east, and the San Francisco–San Mateo County line to the north; it includes Brisbane Lagoon as the southernmost extent, although no development is planned for the lagoon. The primary road through the site is Tunnel Avenue, running north–south. Commuter rail service is provided by Caltrain through the middle of the site, parallel to Tunnel and U.S. 101; the Muni Metro T Third line provides light rail service to San Francisco from the northwest border of the site.

Historical uses
The San Francisco Bay shoreline was just east of Bayshore Highway (which is now Bayshore Boulevard); debris from the 1906 San Francisco earthquake and fill taken from the construction of the Bayshore Cutoff, which opened in 1907, were used to fill a portion of the Bay west of the railroad tracks and east of Bayshore Highway, creating a classification yard for Southern Pacific.

San Francisco's municipal landfill was in operation from 1932 to 1967, filling in the portion of Brisbane Lagoon east of the tracks and west of U.S. 101. U.S. 101 runs along the current shoreline.

Brisbane Baylands concept plans
The Brisbane Baylands site is owned by Universal Paragon Corporation (UPC). The site is being planned for significant regional transportation improvements as analyzed in the Bi-County Transportation Study, including a multi-modal transit station at the  station, connecting Caltrain, an extended Muni Metro T Third Street train, the planned Geneva-Harney bus rapid transit, and multiple bus routes operated by Muni and SamTrans. Geneva Avenue, which currently dead-ends onto Bayshore Boulevard, would be extended across the width of the Baylands and connected to Harney Way.

The earliest plan, later designated the Developer-Sponsored Plan (DSP), was submitted by UPC in 2005 and updated significantly in 2011. Contemporaneously, the City of Brisbane began developing an alternative in 2009 with input from residents, designated the Community Proposed Plan (CPP). The group called the Committee for Renewable Energy in the Baylands (CREBL) advanced another alternative in 2006, designated the Renewable Energy Alternative (REA).

All plans call for environmental remediation of the brownfield land to clean up chemicals left in the soil from its use as a railyard and municipal dump.

Notes

Developer-Sponsored Plan (DSP)
UPC's land use proposal, one of several introduced to Brisbane's city council, calls for the development of an entertainment district that could include an arena, concert theater and cineplex,  of R&D, 1.5 million of office,  of civic space,  of retail, 4,434 housing units, a high school, transit/roadway improvements, 25-acre solar farm and nearly 200 acres of open space. Housing would be limited to the land previously used as the railyard.

Community Proposed Plan (CPP)
The Brisbane Planning Commission submitted an alternative plan in 2009 to the City Council. The primary difference in land use was the lack of any new housing units.

Project timeline

Draft plans
UPC originally submitted a draft plan to the City in 2005. The Schlage Lock factory site just north of the old railyard, within the city limits of San Francisco, was transferred to UPC in 2008 as part of a settlement with the previous owner, Ingersoll-Rand. At the time, the historic Schlage office building was planned to be converted into a community center, and 1,250 housing units would be added to the combined parcel.

In 2010, UPC revised the plan and submitted an updated Baylands Specific Plan and Appendix.

In Feb 2011, UPC submitted the draft Brisbane Baylands Specific Plan and associated Infrastructure Master Plan. The project is projected to create 15,000 – 20,000 permanent jobs and would be built over a 30-year schedule.

Environmental Impact Reports
The Baylands is the subject of an environmental impact report (EIR) prepared for and released by the City of Brisbane on June 11, 2013. The DEIR analyzes four concept plans: the Developer-Sponsored Plan (DSP), DSP with an entertainment variant (DSP-V), the Community Proposed Plan (CPP), and a CPP with a Recology expansion (CPP-V). One of the major findings of the EIR is that "Brisbane currently is a 'jobs rich' city [with] more than four times as many jobs as employed residents [...] the ratio between jobs and employed residents in Brisbane is not balanced [and] such an imbalance between jobs and housing typically contributes to higher homes prices due to demand outstripping supply, increased traffic congestion in the area, increase air and noise pollution, and longer commute times for workers". The EIR found that by providing housing adjacent to the proposed office and transit improvements, car trips and the associated greenhouse gases would be significantly reduced under the DSP concepts; since the CPP concepts only provided new jobs without housing, greenhouse gas emissions would rise.

In addition to the two Concept Plans proposed by UPC (DSP and DSP-V), the EIR analyzes the two Community Proposed Plans which the Brisbane City Council approved for study in July 2009, as well as a fifth, the Renewable Energy Alternative (REA) plan put forth by Citizens for Renewable Energy on the Bay Lands (CREBL), which included land for a solar energy farm.

Civic leaders hoping to host the 2024 Summer Olympics in San Francisco made a proposal in 2014 which included the construction of a temporary stadium for $350 million at the Brisbane Baylands to host opening and closing ceremonies. The Brisbane stadium was proposed as an alternative to a never-built new stadium for the Raiders in Oakland.

Potential annexation
In 2016, the Brisbane Planning Commission recommended dropping both DSP alternatives. Later, in September 2016, the Brisbane City Council indicated it preferred the CPP concept, which included a sustainability statement that "[t]here will be ample housing in the new developments planned across the border in San Francisco for those working in the Baylands who wish to live nearby", which drew criticism from officials in San Francisco and San Mateo County. However, the vote to endorse a specific concept was tabled and moved to 2017. In response, the San Francisco Board of Supervisors deliberated a resolution in October 2016 which, as originally written, directed San Francisco to investigate the feasibility of annexing Brisbane if housing was dropped from the Brisbane Baylands proposal.

Current residents and city leaders of Brisbane were resistant to the DSP concepts, believing that adding so many units of housing to the city would ruin its small-town character. The population of Brisbane in 2017 was estimated at 4,600. State politicians and organizations from outside Brisbane continued to express support for new housing, hoping to alleviate the local housing crisis.

2018 election
The Brisbane City Council certified the EIR in July 2018, selecting a modified version of DSP with a reduced 2,200 homes, and moved the approval of the Brisbane Baylands to the November 2018 general election. At the time, Brisbane Mayor Clarke Conway stated "It was always my hope we'd never put housing out there", a view echoed by several residents. On the other side, supporters of the development hoped the added residences would keep rents affordable.

Measure JJ passed, amending the Brisbane General Plan to allow 1,800 to 2,200 residences and up to 7 million square feet of commercial development on the Brisbane Baylands. With the passage of Measure JJ, UPC can now submit a final development plan for city review. Although the General Plan has been amended according to Measure JJ, actual construction for Brisbane Baylands buildings could start as late as 2028, as more than four years would be required to develop and implement a required soil remediation plan before any basic infrastructure could be added.

References

External links 
 
 
 Universal Paragon Corporation's Brisbane Baylands project page
 Universal Paragon Corporation home page

Planned cities in the United States
Redeveloped ports and waterfronts in the United States